Albert (Ab) Adam "Spats" Gowanlock (December 14, 1900 – September 27, 1988) was a Canadian curler from Manitoba.

Gowanlock was a two-time provincial and two-time Brier champion.

Gowanlock began curling in his hometown of Glenboro, Manitoba. Gowanlock and his rink of E. C. "Bung" Cartwell, Bill McKnight and Tom McKnight became the first team from rural Manitoba to win the Brier in 1938.

Gowanlock would later move to Dauphin, Manitoba where he worked for the Manitoba Department of Highways. He would win a second Brier in 1953 with teammates Jim Williams, Art Pollon and Russ Jackman. Gowanlock was 52 when he won the Brier, and is to date the oldest Brier winning skip in history.

Gowanlock won four Manitoba Curling Association Bonspiels in his career, and played in 57 consecutive tournaments. He was inducted to the Manitoba Sports Hall of Fame in 1984. He died in 1988.

References

External links
Manitoba Sports Hall of Fame and Museum profile
Manitoba Historical Society
Manitoba Sports Hall of Fame, Honoured Members Database

1900 births
1988 deaths
Curlers from Manitoba
Brier champions
Sportspeople from Dauphin, Manitoba
Manitoba Sports Hall of Fame inductees